DC2: Bars of Death is the third studio album by Boston underground hip hop duo 7L & Esoteric. It was released on July 13, 2004.

Track listing

References

External links
 

7L & Esoteric albums
2004 albums
Babygrande Records albums
Albums produced by J-Zone